Domhnall, Earl of Mar may refer to:

 Domhnall I, Earl of Mar
 Domhnall II, Earl of Mar